SS Robert J. Banks was a Liberty ship built in the United States during World War II. She was named after Robert J. Banks.

Construction
Robert J. Banks was laid down on 21 November 1944, under a Maritime Commission (MARCOM) contract, MC hull 2392, by J.A. Jones Construction, Brunswick, Georgia; she was sponsored by Mrs. George Buchanan, and launched on 20 December 1944.

History
She was turned over to Nortraship, on 30 December 1944, reflagged for Norway and renamed Vadsø, after the town of Vadsø, Norway. On 9 October 1946, she was sold for $580,118.63, to the Netherlands. She was reflagged and renamed Libreville after the city of Libreville, French Equatorial Africa, now Gabon. She was scrapped in 1967.

References

Bibliography

 
 
 
 
 

 

Liberty ships
Ships built in Brunswick, Georgia
1944 ships